Nanjai Uthukuli is a large village located in Erode district in the South Indian state of Tamil Nadu.

Demographics
 India census, Nanjai Uthukuli village had a population of 13,234. Males constitute a population 6568 and females 6666. Nanjai Uthukuli has an average literacy rate of 72.54%, the lower than the state average of 80.09%: male literacy is 80.79%, and female literacy is 64.5%. Among the total population of Nanjai Uthukuli, 9.35% of the population is under 6 years of age.
Nagamanikkam Mudaliar was last Zamindar of Nanjai Uthukuli.

See also
 Natadreeswarar Temple

References

Villages in Erode district